Allotalanta deceptrix is a moth in the family Cosmopterigidae. It was described by Edward Meyrick in 1925. It is found in China (Liaoning).

References

Natural History Museum Lepidoptera generic names catalog

Moths described in 1925
Cosmopteriginae
Moths of Asia